The National Toy Hall of Fame is a U.S. hall of fame that recognizes the contributions of toys and games that have sustained their popularity for many years. Criteria for induction include: icon status (the toy is widely recognized, respected, and remembered); longevity (more than a passing fad); discovery (fosters learning, creativity, or discovery); and innovation (profoundly changed play or toy design).  Established in 1998 under the direction of Ed Sobey, it was originally housed at A. C. Gilbert's Discovery Village in Salem, Oregon, United States, but was moved to the Strong National Museum of Play (now The Strong) in Rochester, New York, in 2002 after it outgrew its original home.

Seventy-eight toys have been enshrined in the National Toy Hall of Fame:

Original inductees (1998-99)

2000s

Class of 2000

Class of 2001

Class of 2002

Class of 2003

Class of 2004

Class of 2005

Class of 2006

Class of 2007

Class of 2008
The following toys were added in 2008:

The Stick: Curators praised the stick for its all-purpose, no-cost, recreational qualities, noting its ability to serve either as raw material or an appendage transformed in myriad ways by a child's creativity.
The Baby Doll
The Skateboard

Class of 2009
The following toys were added in 2009:

2010s

Class of 2010
The following toys were added in 2010:

Class of 2011
The following toys were added in 2011:

Class of 2012
The following toys were added in 2012:

Class of 2013
The following toys were added in 2013:

Class of 2014
The following toys were added in 2014:

Class of 2015
The following toys were added in 2015:

Class of 2016
The following toys were added in 2016:

Class of 2017
The following toys were added in 2017:

Class of 2018
The following toys were added in 2018:

Class of 2019
The following toys were added in 2019:

2020s

Class of 2020
The following toys were added in 2020:

Class of 2021
The following toys were added on November 4, 2021:

Class of 2022
The following toys were added on November 10, 2022:

See also

 Toy Industry Hall of Fame, recognizing the contributions of toy-makers.
 List of toys and children's media awards

References

External links
National Toy Hall of Fame  at Strong National Museum of Play, Rochester, NY
Raggedy Ann Inducted in the National Toy Hall of Fame in 2002

Children's media and toys awards
Toy
Toy museums in the United States
Children's museums in New York (state)
Museums in Rochester, New York
Toy halls of fame